Dodangeh-ye Kuchak (also Romanized as Dodāngeh-ye Kūchak, Do Dāngeh Kūchek, Do Dāngeh-ye Kūchek, and Dow Dāngeh-ye Kūchak) is a village in Dodangeh Rural District, in the Central District of Behbahan County, Khuzestan Province, Iran. At the 2006 census, its population was 512, in 116 families.

References 

Populated places in Behbahan County